Cogra Moss is a shallow reservoir to the east of the village of Lamplugh on the western edge of the English Lake District. It was created by the damming of Rakegill Beck in about 1880, though its function as a water supply ceased in 1975. The reservoir, which is surrounded by forestry plantations on three sides, is popular with walkers and anglers.

References

Reservoirs in Cumbria
Lakes of the Lake District
Borough of Copeland